Olivia Coffey (born January 29, 1989) is an American rower. She is a three-time world champion and an Olympian. She won the gold medal in the quad sculls at the 2015 World Rowing Championships. Coffey was in the winning Cambridge crew of The Boat Race 2018.

Life
Coffey was born in 1989 in Elmira, New York. She first competed at rowing whilst at Phillips Academy in 2005. She was a member of the rowing team in her first year at Harvard University. She graduated in 2011. She took sixth in the 2016 rowing championship which qualified her to be the alternate in the US rowing team at the 2016 Olympics.

Coffey became a student at Cambridge University and was a member of the winning women's boat race in 2018.

She represented the United States at the 2020 Summer Olympics.

References

External links
Olivia Coffey at USRowing

1989 births
Living people
American female rowers
Sportspeople from Elmira, New York
World Rowing Championships medalists for the United States
Harvard University alumni
Rowers at the 2020 Summer Olympics
21st-century American women